Rocambole may refer to:

Botany
 The sand leek, Allium scorodoprasum 
 An alternative name for the shallot, Allium ascalonium
 A variety of Hardneck garlic, Allium sativum var. ophioscorodon

Other uses
 Rocambole (character), created by Pierre Alexis Ponson du Terrail as the main character of a series published in daily newspapers between 1857 and 1870
 Rocambole (1948 film), a 1948 French-Italian historical thriller film starring Ponson du Terrail's character
Rocambole (French TV series), a 1964 French drama
 Rocambole (Mexican TV series), Mexican telenovela
 Rocambole, a section of Stay-behind in Norway
 A Brazilian variant of Swiss roll